The Niemodlin dialect (Silesian: ńymodliński djalekt,) is a Silesian dialect, used in the parts of the city of Niemodlin, Poland. Linguists differ in the classification of this dialect, some consider it a dialect of Silesian, some of the Polish language. In Niemodlin Silesian phonology a nasalized vowel y may also occur.

It is closely related to the Prudnik dialect.

Example of the dialect

References 

Polish dialects
Silesian language
City colloquials
Opole County